The 1932–33 season was the 6th season of competitive football in the British Mandate for Palestine under the Eretz Israel Football Association and the 1st under the Arab Palestine Sports Federation.

IFA Competitions

1932–33 Palestine League
Due to a dispute between Hapoel and Maccabi the 1932–33 Palestine League, which started on 29 October 1932, was played with Maccabi teams only. After the dispute was settled in early 1933, the league was abandoned.

Table

1933 Palestine Cup

The cup was contested by Jewish clubs only, as Arab and British teams didn't enter the competition. Both Tel Aviv clubs reached the final, Maccabi winning by a single late goal.

Final

Arab Palestine Sports Federation
A national league was organized for Arab clubs, which was won by Arab Sports Club from Jerusalem.

References